The band of fluctuation is the range within which the market value of a national currency is permitted to fluctuate by international agreements, or by unilateral decision by the central bank.

See also
Fixed exchange rate system
List of circulating fixed exchange rate currencies
Linked exchange rate system in Hong Kong
Managed float regime

Notes and references

Foreign exchange market